Mariannwood Nature Reserve is a 12 hectare protected area in Pinetown, KwaZulu-Natal in South Africa.  The park consists of scarp and riverine forest, as well as grasslands.  The grasslands are noted for their flowers during the spring months.

The park has self-guided trails and picnic facilities.

References 

Nature reserves in South Africa